Cleopatra's Needle in New York City is one of a pair of obelisks, together named Cleopatra's Needles, that were relocated from the ruins of the Caesareum of Alexandria in the 19th century. The 15th-century BC stele  was installed in Central Park, west of the Metropolitan Museum of Art in Manhattan, on February 22, 1881. It was secured in May 1877 by judge Elbert E. Farman, the United States Consul General at Cairo, as a gift from the Khedive for the United States remaining a friendly neutral as the European powers – France and Britain – maneuvered to secure political control of the Egyptian government. The transportation costs were largely paid for by railroad magnate William Henry Vanderbilt, the eldest son of Cornelius Vanderbilt.

It was originally erected in the Egyptian city of Heliopolis on the orders of Thutmose III, in 1475 BC. The granite was brought from the quarries of Aswan near the first cataract of the Nile. The inscriptions were added about 200 years later by Ramesses II to commemorate his military victories. The obelisks were moved to Alexandria and set up in the Caesareum—a temple built by Cleopatra in honor of Mark Antony or Julius Caesar—by the Romans in 12 BC, during the reign of Augustus, but were toppled some time later. This had the fortuitous effect of burying their faces and so preserving most of the hieroglyphs from the effects of weathering.

Acquisition

The original idea to secure an Egyptian obelisk for New York City came from the March 1877 New York City newspaper accounts of the transporting of the London obelisk.  The newspapers mistakenly attributed to a Mr. John Dixon the 1869 proposal of the Khedive of Egypt, Isma'il Pasha, to give the United States an obelisk as a gift for increased trade. Mr. Dixon, the contractor who, in 1877, arranged the transport of the London obelisk, denied the newspaper accounts. 

In March 1877, Mr. Henry G. Stebbins, Commissioner of the Department of Public Parks of the City of New York, undertook to secure the funding to transport the obelisk to New York.

Stebbins then sent two acceptance letters to the Khedive through the Department of State which forwarded them to Judge Farman in Cairo. Realizing that he might be able to secure one of the two remaining upright obelisks—either the mate to the Paris obelisk in Luxor or the London mate in Alexandria—Judge Farman formally asked the Khedive in March 1877, and by May 1877 he had secured the gift in writing.

Location

The obelisk was placed on an obscure site behind the museum. Henry Honeychurch Gorringe, who supervised the movement of the obelisk, William Henry Hulbert, who was involved in early development of the plan, and Frederic Edwin Church, a cofounder of the Metropolitan Museum of Art and a member of the Department of Public Parks in New York City, selected the site of the obelisk in 1879. Gorringe wrote, "In order to avoid needless discussion of the subject, it was decided to maintain the strictest secrecy as to the location determined on." He noted that the prime advantage of the Knoll was its "isolation" and that it was the best site to be found inside the park, as it was quite elevated and the foundation could be firmly anchored in bedrock, lest Manhattan suffer "some violent convulsion of nature."

Importing
The formidable task of moving the obelisk from Alexandria to New York was given to Henry Honychurch Gorringe, a lieutenant commander on leave from the U.S. Navy. The 200-ton granite obelisk was first shifted from vertical to horizontal, nearly crashing to ground in the process. In August 1879 the movement process was suspended for two months because of local protests and legal challenges. Once those were resolved, the obelisk was transported seven miles to Alexandria and then put into the hold of the steamship SS Dessoug, which set sail June 12, 1880. The Dessoug was heavily modified with a large hole cut into the starboard side of its bow. The obelisk was loaded through the ship's hull by rolling it upon cannonballs.

Even with a broken propeller, the SS Dessoug was able to make the journey to the United States. The obelisk and its 50-ton pedestal arrived at the Quarantine Station in New York in early July 1880. It took 32 horses hitched in pairs to bring it from the banks of the East River to Central Park. Railroad ramps and tracks had to be temporarily removed and the ground flattened so that the obelisk could be rolled out of the ship, whose side had been cut open once again for the purpose. The obelisk was carried up the East River and transported to a temporary location off Fifth Avenue. The final leg of the journey was made by pushing the obelisk with a steam engine across a specially built trestle bridge from Fifth Avenue to its new home on Greywacke Knoll, just across the drive from the Metropolitan Museum of Art. It took 112 days to move the obelisk from Quarantine Station to its resting place.

Jesse B. Anthony, Grand Master of Masons in the State of New York, presided as the cornerstone for the obelisk was laid in place with full Masonic ceremony on October 2, 1880. Over 9,000 Masons paraded up Fifth Avenue from 14th Street to 82nd Street, and it was estimated that over 50,000 spectators lined the parade route. The benediction was presented by R. W. Louis C. Gerstein. The obelisk was righted by a special structure built by Henry Honychurch Gorringe. The official ceremony for erecting the obelisk was held February 22, 1881.

Hieroglyphs
The surface of the stone is heavily weathered, nearly masking the rows of Egyptian hieroglyphs engraved on all sides. Photographs taken near the time the obelisk was erected in the park show that the inscriptions or hieroglyphs, as depicted below with translation, were still quite legible and date first from Thutmosis III (1479–1425 BC) and then nearly 300 years later, Ramesses II the Great (1279–1213 BC). The stone had stood in the clear dry Egyptian desert air for nearly 3,000 years and had undergone little weathering. In a little more than a century in the climate of New York City, pollution and acid rain have heavily pitted its surfaces. In 2010, Dr. Zahi Hawass sent an open letter to the president of the Central Park Conservancy and the Mayor of New York City insisting on improved conservation efforts. If they were not able to properly care for the obelisk, he threatened to "take the necessary steps to bring this precious artifact home and save it from ruin".

Buried objects 
A time capsule buried beneath the obelisk contains an 1870 U.S. census, a Bible, a Webster's Dictionary, the complete works of William Shakespeare, a guide to Egypt, and a copy of the United States Declaration of Independence. A small box was also placed in the capsule by the man who arranged the obelisk's purchase and transportation, but its contents remain unknown.

See also
 List of Egyptian obelisks

References

Further reading

15th-century BC steles
Ancient Egyptian obelisks
Central Park
Diplomatic gifts
Landmarks in New York (state)
Monuments and memorials in Manhattan
Obelisks in the United States
Relocated buildings and structures in New York City
Thutmose III
1881 establishments in New York (state)
Cleopatra's Needles